Joseph Marshall de Brett Maréchal, Baron d'Avray (30 November 1811 – 26 November 1871) was a member of the French nobility who became an educator in the Province of New Brunswick.

Known as Marshall d'Avray, he was born in London, England and educated at the French royal court. His father, Joseph Head Marshall 1st Baron of d'Avary,  received his title for his role in restoring the Bourbon dynasty in 1815. Before emigrating in 1848 to Fredericton, New Brunswick in British North America, Marshall d'Avray lived on the island of Mauritius off the coast of Africa where he founded a normal school.

In Fredericton he was appointed the first principal of the Provincial Normal School, serving in that capacity until 1850. In 1852 he was made professor of modern languages at King's College, retaining that position until his death in 1871, four days before his 60th birthday.

Marshall d'Avray served as the province's superintendent of education from 1854 to 1858, during which time he was also the Editor of the Fredericton newspaper, Headquarters.

External links
 The Canadian Encyclopedia
 Canadian Dictionary of Biography Online

1811 births
1871 deaths
Canadian university and college chief executives
Academic staff of the University of New Brunswick
Canadian newspaper editors
Journalists from New Brunswick
Writers from London
Writers from Fredericton
Barons of France
19th-century Canadian journalists
Canadian male journalists
19th-century Canadian male writers
Place of death missing